Love at 0 °C is a Singaporean drama series which aired on Mediacorp Channel 8. It debuted on 10 July 2006 and consists of 20 episodes. The cast consisted of mostly relative newcomers and younger artistes.

Synopsis
Sun Yixin is an aspiring fashion designer but is unable to find a job. Her friend Xiaoling aspires to enter high society and marry a rich man's son and often drags Yixin along to high-class parties. Yixin's mother forces her to help out with her cleaning business. She is forced to do the cleaning herself when she discovers that the business is in debt due to her mother's negligence. Her first assignment was to clean the house of Hu Zhitao, an irascible old man who looks after his grandson with an iron hand and happens to be Guobin's father.

Yixin and Hu Guobin were classmates at design school and share a love-hate relationship. She Weixiang and his partner Victor run a dinner dress rental and auction business. Although from a wealthy background, he is estranged from his father and detests him for having a mistress. By chance, Yixin bumps into them and her fashion expertise comes into handy. A love triangle inevitably forms.

Cast

Main cast
 Elvin Ng as She Weixiang
 Rui En as Sun Yixin
 Julian Hee as Hu Guobin
 Michelle Saram as Anna

Supporting Cast
 Xiang Yun as Liao Qunfang, Yixin's mother
 Chen Tianwen as Sun Zaifa, Yixin's father
 Felicia Chin as Mai Xiaoling
 Chen Shucheng as Hu Zhitao
 Terence Cao as Hu Guojun
 Zen Chong as Victor
 Wang Yuqing as She Jingyuan, Weixiang's father
 Kyle Chan
 Rebecca Lim
 Vivian Lai as Liu Siqi
 Kelvin Tan
 Chen Guohua
 Ezann Lee as Coco

Awards & Nominations

Production

Soundtrack 
The theme song of this show is sung by Rui En, and it is her first drama theme song

See also
List of programmes broadcast by Mediacorp Channel 8

References

External links
Official Site
Love At 0°C (Chinese)

Singapore Chinese dramas